Yangzhuang station is a station on Line 6 of the Beijing Subway. It was opened on December 30, 2018.

Station layout 
The station has an underground island platform.

Exits 
There are 4 exits, lettered A, B, C1, and C2. Exits A and C1 are accessible.

References

External links 
 Beijing Subway official map, showing official English name

Beijing Subway stations in Shijingshan District
Railway stations in China opened in 2018